Zay Hilfigerrr & Zayion McCall are an American hip hop duo from Detroit, Michigan.

Hilfigerrr (born Tyjuan Peoples) began his career on social media platforms, making videos of raps, dances, and comedic skits. His stage name is an homage to Tommy Hilfiger; "Zay" is a self-applied nickname. Hilfigerrr was approached by Timothy McCall, a local film producer, whose son, James McCall, is also a rapper. McCall, who took the alias Zayion, worked with Hilfigerrr to create the song "Juju on That Beat", whose backing track was based on Crime Mob's "Knuck If You Buck". The song went viral after members of the dancing group Fresh the Clowns began uploading videos of themselves dancing to it on social media. Atlantic Records picked up the song for official distribution in 2016, and it eventually reached #5 on the Billboard Hot 100. By February 2017, the song had been streamed on YouTube over 150 million times, by which time Hilfigerrr was 16 years old. The song was also nominated for a Kids' Choice Award for Favorite Music Video. In the version initially released by Hilfigerrr and McCall, the track was only 2:02 in length, one of the shortest songs to hit the Billboard Hot 100 in the past forty years. However, the Atlantic Records reissue was 2:23 in length.

References

Hip hop duos
American hip hop groups
Musical groups from Detroit
Year of birth missing (living people)
African-American musical groups